Mount Karpinsky may refer to:

 Karpinsky Ice Cap, October Revolution Island, Severnaya Zemlya, Russian Arctic4
 Mount Karpinskiy in Antarctica
 Mount Karpinsky (Urals) at 1878 m lying between the Tyumen Oblast and the Komi Republic in Russia
 The Karpinsky Group of volcanoes on Paramushir Island in the Kurils